Aboagye is a surname. Notable people with the surname include:

 Eric Aboagye, Ghanaian oncologist
 Felix Aboagye (born 1975), Ghanaian footballer
 Clifford Aboagye (born 1995), Ghanaian footballer
 Kwasi Sintim Aboagye (born 1919), Ghanaian politician, member of parliament during the first republic
 P. A. K. Aboagye (1925–2001), Ghanaian poet, writer and historian
 Lawrence Aboagye Okai (or Lawrence Okai) (born 1934), Ghanaian military officer

Surnames of Akan origin